is a Japanese competitive sailor. She competed at the 2016 Summer Olympics in Rio de Janeiro, in the women's 470 class.

References

External links
 
 
 

1990 births
Living people
Japanese female sailors (sport)
Olympic sailors of Japan
Sailors at the 2016 Summer Olympics – 470
Sailors at the 2020 Summer Olympics – 470
Asian Games medalists in sailing
Asian Games gold medalists for Japan
Sailors at the 2018 Asian Games
Medalists at the 2018 Asian Games